Anemia or anaemia may refer to:
 Anemia, a qualitative or quantitative hemoglobin deficiency
 Iron deficiency anemia, a type of anemia of lack of iron
 Ischemia, producing localized anemic effects in a body part (but "anemia" is not merely synonymous with "ischemia" in modern usage)
 Anemia (beetle), a genus of darkling beetle
 Anemia (plant), a genus of fern
 Anemia (film), a 1986 Italian film
 "Anaemia", a song from the album Food by British rock band Zico Chain
 "Anaemia", a song from the album The Blue by Italian metal band Novembre

See also
Anema (disambiguation)
Anima (disambiguation)